HomeGoods is a chain of home furnishing stores headquartered in Framingham, Massachusetts. It was founded as a small chain in 1992, and grew to include hundreds of locations throughout the United States. HomeGoods sells furniture, linens, cooking products, art and other home accessories. 

HomeGoods is owned by TJX Companies, and is a sister company to T.J. Maxx, Sierra Trading Post, and Marshalls. The size of each store varies by location. There are locations in the United States that combine both the HomeGoods and the T.J. Maxx or Marshalls store brands in one building.

In Canada and Europe, the parent company of HomeGoods operates a similar home furnishing chain called HomeSense. In August 2017, TJX announced the opening of about 400 HomeSense stores across America.

HomeGoods has an associated app called "The Goods" which allows customers to see available products at store locations.

References

External links

HomeGoods Official Website
TJX Companies Official Website

Furniture retailers of the United States
Home decor retailers
Companies based in Framingham, Massachusetts
Retail companies established in 1992
TJX Companies